USS Bulwark is a name used more than once by the U.S. Navy:

 , renamed Avenge on 23 May 1941
 , a coastal minesweeper, laid down on 15 April 1941
 , a minesweeper, laid down on 12 December 1951

References 
 

United States Navy ship names